James Butler (1651–1696) was an English politician. He was Member of Parliament for Arundel from 1679 to 1685 and 1690. Butler was a member of the wealthy Butler family who were influential figures in the county of Sussex. Butler himself was from Amberley, West Sussex.

References

1651 births
1696 deaths
People from Amberley, West Sussex
English MPs 1679
English MPs 1680–1681
English MPs 1681
English MPs 1690–1695
People from Arundel